Billy Smart Jr. (born Stanley Smart, 15 October 1934 – 23 May 2005) was a British circus performer and impresario.

Biography

Smart, whose real name was Stanley, was the tenth child and third son of Billy Smart Sr. His father was a showman and fairground proprietor, who bought a circus in 1946. He would travel with the Circus and go to local schools when at a location for a lengthy period. One school was 'All Saints' at Blackheath, London in 1958, the heath being a regular location for the circus. The first appearance of the Billy Smart circus was on 5 April at Southall Park in Middlesex. The circus toured alongside Smart's funfair; the tents blew down and the circus carried out its performances for two days in the open air. Smart made his circus debut with "Billy Smart's New World Circus" as assistant ringmaster aged 12. He was soon performing with ponies and horses, but became best known later for his elephant acts. In one famous incident, he tamed a herd of performing elephants when they stampeded in the ring. At its peak, Billy Smart's four-masted Big Top could hold over 6,000 people, with a show including hundreds of animals and performers.

Smart, together with his brothers, Ronald Smart and David Smart, took over management of the circus when their father died in 1966 at Ipswich. The circus ceased touring in 1971, but televised performances continued until 1983, drawing audiences of up to 22 million at its height. The Smart Brothers also developed Guernsey Zoo, selling it in 1972, and opened Windsor Safari Park in 1969 before selling it in 1977, for the equivalent of £30m in 2017 (it is now the site of Legoland Windsor). He lost the sight in his right eye in 1978 after cosmetic surgery severed the optic nerve, ending his career as an animal trainer.

In 1985, the Smart circus Winkfield winter quarters were sold for the equivalent of £20m in 2017.

The "Billy Smart's" touring circus was revived by his brother Ronald and nephew Gary in 1993, but Smart concentrated on a second career as a property developer, based in Spain.

In popular culture
In the Netherlands, Billy Smart was known for the annual "Billy Smart's Kinderkerstcircus" ("Billy Smart's Children Christmas Circus") TV broadcast. Dutch singer Fay Lovsky listed Billy Smart in her 1981 hit "Christmas Was A Friend of Mine" as one of her favourite Christmas traditions.

"Circus of Horrors" (1960), directed by Sydney Hayers, was filmed in Billy Smarts Circus. In the picture, it was called the "Schuler" circus. It was used in the film Berserk! (1967), starring Joan Crawford and Diana Dors. In the movie the circus was called the Great Rivers Circus.

References

 ("BFI Screenonline: Big Top Variety Show (1979-1982))
 ("The Telegraph", Billy Smart and Savoy Connection)

Obituaries
Obituary (The Guardian, 24 May 2005)
Obituary (The Telegraph, 24 May 2005)
Obituary (The Times, 24 May 2005)
 ("The Herald Scotland", 24 May 2005

External links
Billy Smart's Circus
Billy Smart Sr. in Circopedia
Only Circus attended by a reigning monarch

1934 births
2005 deaths
Deaths from lung cancer
British entertainers
Circus owners